Ippadiyum Oru Penn is a 1975 Indian Tamil-language film produced, directed and written by Bhanumathi Ramakrishna for Bharani Pictures. The film stars herself, Sivakumar and Devika. It was released on 1 May 1975.

Plot

Cast 
Bhanumathi Ramakrishna as Savitri
Sivakumar
Devika
Srikanth
Kumari Padmini
Thengai Srinivasan
Manorama

Production 
Bhanumathi Ramakrishna, in addition to writing, directing and producing, also played the lead role. The dialogues were written by Aaroor Dass.

Soundtrack 
The soundtrack was composed by Bhanumathi Ramakrishna. It features a version of "Manasa Sancharare", composed by Sadasiva Brahmendra.

Release and reception 
Ippadiyum Oru Penn was released on 1 May 1975. Kanthan of Kalki praised the film's music, screenplay and cast performances.

References

External links 
 

1970s Tamil-language films
1975 films
Films scored by P. Bhanumathi